Yaltaran (Yaltıran) is a rural locality (a village) in Kulguninsky Selsoviet, Ishimbaysky District, Bashkortostan, Russia. The population was 23 as of 2010. There is 1 street.

Geography 
Yaltaran is located 98 km east of Ishimbay (the district's administrative centre) by road. Kabyasovo is the nearest rural locality.

References 

Rural localities in Ishimbaysky District